Epiphanidae is a family of rotifers belonging to the order Ploima.

Genera:
 Cyrtonia Rousselet, 1894
 Epiphanes Ehrenberg, 1832
 Liliferotrocha Sudzuki, 1959
 Microcodides Bergendal, 1892
 Proalides de Beauchamp, 1907
 Rhinoglena Ehrenberg, 1853

References

Ploima
Rotifer families